Bathycongrus bertini is an eel in the family Congridae (conger/garden eels). It was described by Max Poll in 1953, originally under the genus Congermuraena. It is a marine, deep water-dwelling eel which is known from Mauritania to Angola, in the eastern Atlantic Ocean. It dwells at a depth range of 200–400 metres. Males can reach a maximum total length of 39 centimetres.

References

bertini
Fish described in 1953